Riyaaz Amlani (born 20 November 1974) is an Indian restaurateur. He is the CEO of Impresario Entertainment & Hospitality Pvt Ltd. He is also the president of National Restaurant Association of India (NRAI).

References

External links
Impresario Entertainment & Hospitality Pvt. Ltd.
NRAI website

Living people
Indian restaurateurs
1974 births